
The Italian Flag, is the third album by the band Prolapse, released in October 1997 on Radar Records in the UK. The album was produced by Donald Ross Skinner, who then joined the band, playing on the subsequent tours to support the album's release.

The album was originally released on double 12” vinyl and CD by Radar Records in the UK & Europe, and on CD by Jetset Records in the US.

Track listing
All songs written by Prolapse

Personnel

Band
 Mick Derrick - vocals, stylophone
 Mick Harrison - bass, guitar
 David Jeffreys - guitar, vocals
 Pat Marsden - guitar, keyboards
 Tim Pattinson - drums
 Linda Steelyard - vocals, keyboard, recorder

Production
 Produced by Donald Ross Skinner
 Recorded & Mixed by Martin Wilding (except Killing The Bland and Visa For Violet And Van)
 Recorded by Paul Kendall (Killing The Bland and Visa For Violet And Van recording only)
 Artwork by Matthew Cooper, Mick Harrison, Paul Harrison

References

1997 albums
Radar Records albums
Prolapse (band) albums